I Am Alive is a 2012 video game.

I Am Alive may also refer to:

I Am Alive: Surviving the Andes Plane Crash, a 2010 television documentary
"I Am Alive", a song by Little Man Tate, 2009
"I Am Alive", a song by Paul van Dyk from From Then On, 2017
"I Am Alive", a song by Ultravox from Revelation, 1993

See also
I'm Alive (disambiguation)